3D computer graphics software refers to programs used to create 3D computer-generated imagery.

General information

Current software
This table compares elements of notable software that is currently available, based on the raw software without the inclusion of additional plugins.

Inactive software 
There are many discontinued software applications.

Operating system support
The operating systems on which the editors can run natively (without emulation or compatibility layers), meaning which operating systems have which editors specifically coded for them (not, for example, Wings 3D for Windows running on Linux with Wine).

Features

I/O

Image, video, and audio files

general 3D files

Game and renderer files

Cache and animation files

CAD files

Point clouds and photogrammetry files

GIS and DEM files

Supported primitives

Modeling

Lookdev / Shader writing

Lighting

Path-tracing Rendering

Level of Detail (LoD) Generation/Baking

See also
Comparison of raster graphics editors
Comparison of vector graphics editors
Comparison of computer-aided design editors
Comparison of CAD, CAM and CAE file viewers

References

 
3D computer graphics software

de:3D-Grafik-Software
fr:Logiciel de modélisation 3D
ja:3DCGソフトウェア
ro:Programe de grafică 3D
fi:Luettelo 3D-grafiikkaohjelmista
zh:三维计算机图形软件